My Lovely Girl is a 2014 South Korean television series starring Rain, Krystal Jung, Kim Myung-soo, and Cha Ye-ryun. Having the K-pop industry as the backdrop, the drama tells the story of two pained individuals who find healing through music. It aired on SBS from September 17 to November 6, 2014 on Wednesdays and Thursdays at 21:55 for 16 episodes.

Synopsis
Lee Hyun-wook (Rain) is the CEO of a talent agency that scouts and trains idols. Hyun-wook lives in great difficulty as he is unable to let go of his ex-girlfriend who died in an accident 3 years ago, which he witnessed first hand. His ex-girlfriend's sister, Yoon Se-na (Krystal), moves to Seoul in order to pursue her music-composing career and meets Hyun-wook who helps her achieve it. As Hyun-wook replaces his father (Park Yeong-gyu) as the president of ANA Entertainment, he faces challenges in his career. In the midst of healing each other through music, Hyun-wook and Se-na fall in love.

Cast

Main
Rain as Lee Hyun-wook
A successful singer, songwriter and producer. He appears cold and indifferent on the outside but is sensitive and kind-hearted. After So-eun's death, he left the music industry as he couldn't write songs any more. When he received a call from Se-na, he looks for her and eventually brought her into his company, ANA Entertainment. As he falls in love with Se-na, he is able to write songs again.
 
Krystal Jung as Yoon Se-na
An aspiring singer and songwriter, and sister of Yoon So-eun. She becomes acquainted with Hyun-wook while trying to find her sister, whom she later develops feelings for. She has a bickering relationship with Shi-woo, and is continuously wavered by his advances.

Kim Myung-soo as Shi-woo/Yong-bok
A member of boyband Infinite Power under ANA Entertainment. He is seemingly arrogant but he turns kinder to Yoon Se-na whom he develops feelings for. He is at constant conflicts over Lee Hyun-wook, who chastise him for his irresponsible actions, as well as due to their rivalry for Se-na's love.

Cha Ye-ryun as Shin Hae-yoon
One of the directors in ANA Entertainment. She has a long-term crush for Lee Hyun-wook, and constantly disrupts his relationships, with both Se-na and So-eun.

Supporting

People in AnA Entertainment
Alex Chu as Bae Sung-jin
Kim Jin-woo as Seo Jae-young
Kim Ki-bang as Yoo Sang-bong
Lee Soo-ji as An Da-jung
Jo Hee-bong as Kang Tae-min
Na Hae-ryung as Yoo Ra-eum
Shi-woo's ex-girlfriend and Rae-hoon's current girlfriend.
Hoya as Kang Rae-hoon
Leader of fictional idol group Infinite Power.
Lee Dae-yeol as San-ah
Member of fictional idol group Infinite Power.
Choi Sung-yoon as Jun-jun
Member of fictional idol group Infinite Power.
Gong Seung-yeon as Seo Yoon-ji
Fiestar as Fiestar
Choi Hyo-eun as Mi-sung

Others
Park Young-gyu as Lee Jong-ho
Hyun-wook's father.
Kim Hye-eun as Oh Hee-seon
Kim Dani as Lee Min-ah
Lee Cho-hee as Joo-hong
Park Doo-shik as Cha Gong-chul
Lee Shi-ah as Yoon So-eun (cameo)
Lee Soo-min as the young Yoon So-eun (cameo)
Hyun-wook's ex-girlfriend who died in a car accident.

Production
This drama is Director Park Hyung-ki and Writer Noh Ji-seol's third collaboration after Scent of a Woman and Dr. Champ.  The first read-through was held in August 2014 at an SBS studio in Ilsan. A press conference was held on September 15, 2014.

Original soundtrack

Ratings

References

External links
 
 

2014 South Korean television series debuts
2014 South Korean television series endings
Seoul Broadcasting System television dramas
Korean-language television shows
South Korean romantic comedy television series
South Korean musical television series
Television series by AStory